EMI-Capitol Special Markets was an EMI subsidiary handling distribution for special markets. It bought 3C Records in the early nineties.

It later operated as EMI Music Marketing and EMI Music Distribution in North America but have since been absorbed into Universal Music Enterprises after Universal Music Group acquired EMI recorded music division (including most of North American assets) while UMG divested selected EMI assets (such as Parlophone and Roulette Records) to Warner Music Group and those assets are now managed in North America by Rhino Entertainment.

References

See also 
 List of record labels

EMI
Record label distributors